Geist Reservoir is a reservoir in the northeastern part of metropolitan Indianapolis, Indiana, United States. It was constructed in 1943 by damming Fall Creek to provide water for Indianapolis. The reservoir is located primarily in the northeast corner of Indianapolis and the southeast corner of Fishers, but small parts reach into the nearby towns of Lawrence, Fortville, and McCordsville.

History
Geist Reservoir was named after Clarence H. Geist, a former owner of the Indianapolis Water Company, who foresaw a deficit in Indianapolis's water supply and envisioned the Geist Reservoir to preemptively address the problem. Planning for the reservoir began as early as 1913, when hydraulic engineers estimated that White River and Fall Creek would not provide enough water for the increasing needs of Indianapolis. Although controversial, the reservoir was completed in 1943, five years after Clarence Geist's death. In the 1960s further controversy arose over plans for commercial and residential development in the area around the lake. A proposal in the 1970s to triple the size of the reservoir was defeated, and a housing boom began in the lake area.

In recent years the Geist area has experienced rapid growth. The area is noted for its topography and the reservoir. In recent years the reservoir has experienced problems with algal blooms and invasive aquatic species.

As the result of a series of sales, the water company and the reservoir are now owned by Citizens Energy Group.

Description
Geist Reservoir Dam is located at the lake's southern end. Fed by Fall Creek on the north, the lake overflow is directed into the creek again at the south. The reservoir capacity is 60,000 acre-feet (74,000,000 m3), although normal storage is 21,180 acre-feet (26,100,000 m3).

The area has undergone rapid development and some high-valued homes now line the reservoir's waterfront.

Citizens Reservoir 
In 2019, Citizens Energy Group began work to convert a former limestone quarry adjacent to Geist Reservoir into a supplemental reservoir named Citizens Reservoir. It holds , equal to almost half the capacity of Geist Reservoir itself. Up to  a day can be diverted into Citizens Reservoir when Geist Reservoir is full instead of going over the latter's spillway. When needed, up to  a day can be pumped from Citizens back into Geist. Construction was completed in 2020, and the reservoir was filled by early 2021.

The limestone quarry was previously owned by Irving Materials Inc. and had operated for 50 years before closing in 2018. Citizens Energy spent over $20 million on the project.

See also
 List of dams and reservoirs in Indiana

References

External links

Reservoirs in Indiana
Geography of Indianapolis
Protected areas of Marion County, Indiana
Protected areas of Hamilton County, Indiana
Protected areas of Hancock County, Indiana
1943 establishments in Indiana
Dams in Indiana
Dams completed in 1943
United States privately owned dams
Bodies of water of Marion County, Indiana
Bodies of water of Hamilton County, Indiana
Bodies of water of Hancock County, Indiana